Enzo Moser (5 November 1940 – 25 July 2008) was an Italian professional road bicycle racer from 1962 to 1967. He was the first winner of the Giro del Trentino in 1962. He came from a famous family of cyclists, the most famous of whom is his younger brother Francesco Moser, which also includes older brother Aldo, younger brother Diego and nephews Leonardo Moser and Moreno Moser, all of whom are or were professional cyclists. His achievements also include two days in the pink jersey during the 1964 Giro d'Italia. He was born in Palù di Giovo, Trentino, which incidentally is also the birthplace of Gilberto Simoni. He was killed in an agricultural accident on 25 July 2008.

Major results
1961
 1st Trofeo Alcide Degasperi
1962
 1st  Overall Giro del Trentino
 10th Coppa Placci
1963
 4th Giro dell'Emilia
1964
 10th Coppa Placci
1965
 5th Giro di Romagna
 6th Overall Tour de Suisse

References

1940 births
2008 deaths
Italian male cyclists
People from Giovo
Sportspeople from Trentino
Farming accident deaths
Accidental deaths in Italy
Cyclists from Trentino-Alto Adige/Südtirol